Sanesi is an Italian surname. Notable people with the surname include:

Consalvo Sanesi (1911–1998), Italian racecar driver
Gaia Sanesi (born 1992), Italian tennis player

Italian-language surnames